Ernest Hayes "Herc" Alley (June 4, 1904 – August 24, 1971) was an American football player, track athlete, and coach.  He served as head men's track coach at Vanderbilt University from 1949 to 1971. Alley was also the head football coach at Middle Tennessee State Teachers College—now known as Middle Tennessee State University—in 1939 and at Vanderbilt in 1943, compiling a career college football record of 6–6–1.

A native of Tracy City, Tennessee, Alley played football as an end at the University of Tennessee from 1927 to 1928. He died of a heart attack, on August 24, 1971, at his home in Nashville, Tennessee.

Head coaching record

Football

References

External links
 

1904 births
1971 deaths
American football ends
Auburn Tigers football coaches
Middle Tennessee Blue Raiders baseball coaches
Middle Tennessee Blue Raiders football coaches
Tennessee Volunteers football coaches
Tennessee Volunteers football players
Vanderbilt Commodores football coaches
Tennessee Volunteers men's track and field athletes
Vanderbilt Commodores track and field coaches
People from Tracy City, Tennessee
Coaches of American football from Tennessee
Players of American football from Tennessee
Track and field athletes from Tennessee